The National Democratic Union of Equatorial Guinea is a liberal party in exile from in Equatorial Guinea.
The party is a member of Liberal International.

See also
Liberalism
Contributions to liberal theory
Liberalism worldwide
List of liberal parties
Liberal democracy

Liberal parties in Africa
Political parties in Equatorial Guinea